Myanma Pharmaceutical Industrial Enterprise (MPIE) is a state-owned enterprise (SOE) under the Ministry of Industry that conducts R&D, manufacturing and distribution for over 200 essential pharmaceuticals.

MPIE has a domestic market share ranging between 3% to 10%. MPIE also exports antivenom drugs to neighboring Cambodia and Laos. In 2016, MPIE produced over 800 million tablets and capsules, and has launched new product lines including vaccinations and antibiotics, in recent years. MPIE also supplies drugs to other government agencies, including the Ministry of Defence, and the Ministry of Health and Sports.

History
During the socialist era, Burma had a single registered drug producer, the Burma Pharmaceutical Industry (BPI), whose brand had a solid reputation among domestic consumers. It was renamed the Myanmar Pharmaceutical Factory (MPF) in 1988. MPIE continues to use the BPI trademark, because the brand name remains reputable and highly recognized domestically.

Operations
MPIE operates 3 state-owned pharmaceutical factories throughout Myanmar:
 Insein, Yangon Region
 Inyaung, Kyaukse Township, Mandalay Region
Ywathagyi, Hlegu Township, Yangon Region

See also
Healthcare in Myanmar
Food and Drug Administration (Myanmar)

References

External links
BPI official website

Government-owned companies of Myanmar
Healthcare in Myanmar